T&P may refer to:

Texas and Pacific Railway
Terrance and Phillip
Terre et Peuple
Thoughts and prayers
Timon and Pumbaa
Twist and Pulse, an English street dance duo
Temperature and pressure, in engineering, particularly engine temperatures and pressures